Sharon C. Glotzer is an American scientist and "digital alchemist," the Anthony C. Lembke Department Chair of Chemical Engineering, the John Werner Cahn Distinguished University Professor of Engineering and the Stuart W. Churchill Collegiate Professor of Chemical Engineering at the University of Michigan, where she is also Professor of Materials Science & Engineering, Professor of Physics, Professor of Macromolecular Science & Engineering, and Professor of Applied Physics. She is recognized  for her contributions to the fields of soft matter and computational science, most notably on problems in assembly science and engineering, nanoscience, and the glass transition, for which the elucidation of the nature of  dynamical heterogeneity in glassy liquids is of particular significance. She is a member of the National Academy of Sciences, the National Academy of Engineering, and the American Academy of Arts and Sciences.

Education
Glotzer obtained her B.S in physics at the University of California, Los Angeles, in 1987, and her PhD in 1993 in theoretical soft condensed matter physics research under the guidance of H. Eugene Stanley at Boston University.

Academic career
Sharon Glotzer joined the National Institute of Standards and Technology NIST in Gaithersburg, Maryland, in 1993 as a National Research Council postdoctoral fellow in the Polymers Division of the Materials Science & Engineering Laboratory. She became a permanent member of the Polymers Division, and was the co-founder, deputy director, and then director of the NIST Center for Theoretical and Computational Materials Science from 1994 to 2000. In January 2001 she moved to the University of Michigan as a tenured associate professor in Chemical Engineering and in Materials Science & Engineering. She is now the Anthony C. Lembke Department Chair of Chemical Engineering, the John Werner Cahn Distinguished University Professor of Engineering, and the Stuart W. Churchill Collegiate Professor of Chemical Engineering. Glotzer holds additional appointments in Materials Science and Engineering, Physics, Applied Physics, and Macromolecular Science and Engineering, and is a core member of the Biointerfaces Institute. She is a member of several boards, including the Board of Directors of the Materials Research Society, and the Board on Chemical Sciences and Technology of the National Academies of Sciences, Engineering, and Medicine. She serves as Associate Editor of the leading nanoscience journal ACS Nano.

Research and achievements
Glotzer made fundamental contributions to the field of the glass transition, for which the molecular dynamics simulation of Lennard-Jones particles exhibiting dynamical heterogeneity in the form of string-like motion in a 3D-liquid is of particular significance. In addition, her paper together with Michael J. Solomon on anisotropy dimensions of patchy particles has become a classic work, inspiring research directions of groups around the world. Glotzer and collaborators also hold the record for the densest tetrahedron packing and discovered that hard tetrahedrons can self-assemble into a dodecagonal quasicrystal.

Glotzer and collaborators coined the term ‘Directional Entropic Forces’ in 2011 to denote the effective interaction that drives anisotropic hard particles to align their facets during self-assembly and/or crystallization. This idea, which builds on Onsager's work on spherocylinders, allows for predictions of expected assembled crystal and crystal-like structures from attributes of the particles' shape.

According to Google Scholar, her publications have received over 22,000 citations and her h-index is 75.

Honors and awards
Glotzer was elected a member of the National Academy of Engineering in 2019 for the development of computer-based design principles for assembly engineering and manufacturing of advanced materials and nanotechnology. She was also elected a member of the National Academy of Sciences in 2014 and the American Academy of Arts and Sciences in 2011. She is a Fellow of the American Physical Society, the American Association for the Advancement of Science, the American Institute of Chemical Engineers, and the Materials Research Society. She is a member of the second inaugural class of Department of Defense National Security Science and Engineering (now Vannevar Bush) Faculty Fellows, and was named a Simons Investigator in 2012, part of the inaugural class of Investigators. Like the MacArthur "Genius" Awardees, both Vannevar Bush Faculty Fellows and Simons Investigators receive significant funding to pursue unrestricted basic research. Glotzer is the recipient of numerous awards, including the [Nanoscale Science & Engineering Forum Award, the Alpha Chi Sigma Award and the Charles M.A. Stine Award, all from the American Institute of Chemical Engineers (AIChE); the MRS Medal from the Materials Research Society; the Aneesur Rahman Prize in Computational Physics and the Maria Goeppert-Mayer Award, both from the American Physical Society; a Presidential Early Career Award for Scientists and Engineers (PECASE); and a Department of Commerce Bronze Medal Award for Superior Federal Service. In 2014, she became an associate editor of ACS Nano.

Footnotes

Articles

External links
 
 
 
 

American women physicists
Date of birth missing (living people)
Living people
Fellows of the American Academy of Arts and Sciences
University of Michigan faculty
Boston University alumni
University of California, Los Angeles alumni
Scientists from Michigan
20th-century American physicists
21st-century American physicists
20th-century American women scientists
21st-century American women scientists
Fellows of the American Physical Society
Fellows of the American Institute of Chemical Engineers
Members of the United States National Academy of Sciences
Fellows of the American Association for the Advancement of Science
Members of the United States National Academy of Engineering
Scientific computing researchers
Simons Investigator
Year of birth missing (living people)
American women academics